The 7th Legislative Assembly of Quebec was the provincial legislature that existed in Quebec, Canada from June 17, 1890, to March 8, 1892. The Quebec Liberal Party led by Honoré Mercier was the governing party for most of the mandate. The party was also known as the Parti national which composed previously of Conservative dissents that formed a new party, the Parti National. However, Mercier was dismissed by the Lieutenant-Governor Auguste-Réal Angers due to a scandal and the final months of the Assembly was led by Charles Boucher de Boucherville of the Quebec Conservative Party. Due to the minority status of the government in the final months, an election was immediately called.

Seats per political party

 After the 1890 elections

Member list

This was the list of members of the Legislative Assembly of Quebec that were elected in the 1890 election:

Other elected MLAs

No MLAs were elected during by-elections in this mandate

Cabinet Ministers

Mercier Cabinet (1890-1891)

 Prime Minister: Honoré Mercier
 Executive Council President: Charles Langelier (1890), David Alexander Ross (1890–1891)
 Agriculture and Colonization: Honoré Mercier
 Public Works: Pierre Garneau
 Crown Lands: Georges Duhamel
 Attorney General: Arthur Turcotte (1890), Joseph-Emery Robidoux (1890–1891)
 Secretary and Registry: Joseph-Émery Robidoux (1890), Charles Langelier (1890–1891)
 Treasurer: Joseph Shehyn
 Members without portfolios: Arthur Boyer

De Boucherville Cabinet (1891-1892)

 Prime Minister and Executive Council President: Charles-Eugène Boucher de Boucherville
 Agriculture and Colonization: Louis Beaubien
 Public Works: Guillaume-Alphonse Nantel
 Crown Lands: Edmund James Flynn
 Attorney General: Thomas Chase Casgrain
 Provincial secretary: Louis-Philippe Pelletier
 Treasurer: John Smythe Hall
 Members without portfolios: Louis-Olivier Taillon, John McIntosh

References
 1890 election results
 List of historical Cabinet Ministers

007